Wait and See may refer to:

 Wait and See (1928 film), a British comedy film directed by Walter Forde
 Wait and See (1998 film), a Japanese film by Shinji Sōmai
 Wait and See (album), a 1985 live album by jazz pianist Duke Jordan
 "Wait & See (Risk)", a 2000 song by the Japanese-American singer Hikaru Utada
 "Wait and See" (Brandon Heath song), 2009